Fakhraddin Musa oghlu Musayev (30 July 1957, Baýramaly, Turkmenistan – 11 April 1992, Fuzuli District, Azerbaijan) was the National Hero of Azerbaijan and warrior during the First Nagorno-Karabakh War.

Early life and education 
Fakhraddin Musayev was born on 30 July 1957 in Baýramaly, Turkmenistan. He went to secondary school from 1964 to 1974. He was drafted to the military service. Initially, he was sent to Czechoslovakia, and then completed his military service in the Orenburg Oblast. In 1979 he was admitted to the Civil Aviation School, where he graduated in 1982 with honors.

Personal life 
Musayev was married and had one son.

First Nagorno-Karabakh War 
After the establishment of the national army, he returned to Azerbaijan and participated in military operations in Karabakh. In March 1992 he started to work as a pilot-operator in Mi-24 military helicopter. Fakhraddin destroyed most of the Armenian forces and armored vehicles with relative rocket strikes. On 11 April 1992, Lieutenant Fakhradin was killed when carrying out a missile attack in the territory of Fizuli region.

Honors
Fakhraddin Musayev was posthumously awarded the title of the "National Hero of Azerbaijan" by Presidential Decree No. 833 dated 7 June 1992. He was buried in the Martyrs' Lane in Baku.

One of the central streets in Qusar District of Azerbaijan was named after him.

See also 
 First Nagorno-Karabakh War
 National Hero of Azerbaijan

References

Sources 
Vugar Asgarov. Azərbaycanın Milli Qəhrəmanları (Yenidən işlənmiş II nəşr). Bakı: "Dərələyəz-M", 2010, səh. 218.

1957 births
1992 deaths
Azerbaijani military personnel
Azerbaijani military personnel of the Nagorno-Karabakh War
Azerbaijani military personnel killed in action
National Heroes of Azerbaijan
People from Mary Region